Seilandstuva is the highest mountain on the island of Seiland in Troms og Finnmark county, Norway.

Name
The last element is the finite form of tuve which means "tuft of grass" or "tussock" and the first part is referring to the island on which it is located.

References

Alta, Norway
Hammerfest
Mountains of Troms og Finnmark